Hossameldin Gomaa (born 15 February 1984) is an Egyptian volleyball player. He competed in the men's tournament at the 2008 Summer Olympics.

References

1984 births
Living people
Egyptian men's volleyball players
Olympic volleyball players of Egypt
Volleyball players at the 2008 Summer Olympics
Place of birth missing (living people)